A sand lance or sandlance is a fish belonging to the family Ammodytidae.  Several species of sand lances are commonly known as "sand eels", though they are not related to true eels.  Another variant name is launce, and all names of the fish are references to its slender body and pointed snout.  The family name (and genus name, Ammodytes) means "sand burrower", which describes the sand lance's habit of burrowing into sand to avoid tidal currents.

Sand lances are most commonly encountered by fishermen in the North Pacific and North Atlantic, but are found in oceans throughout the world.  These fish do not have pelvic fins and do not develop swim bladders, staying true to their bottom-dwelling habit as adults.  Both adult and larval sea lances primarily feed on copepods.  Larval forms of this fish are perhaps the most abundant of all fish larvae in areas such as the northwest Atlantic, serving as a major food item for cod, salmon, whales and other commercially important species.  As adults, sand lances are harvested commercially in some areas (primarily in Europe), leading to direct human competition with diving birds such as puffins, auks, terns, and cormorants.  Some species are inshore coastal dwellers, and digging for sand lances to use as a bait fish has been a popular pastime in coastal areas of Europe and North America.  Other species are deep-water dwellers, some of which have only recently been described to science, and most of which lack common names.
Sand lances have chameleon-like independent eye movements.

Timeline

See also 
The sand lance has lent its name to two submarines of the United States Navy:
 , a Sturgeon-class nuclear submarine.

References
 
 biologists.org on independent eye movements

External links 
Sand Lance profile at Fisheries and Oceans Canada

 
Trachiniformes
Articles which contain graphical timelines
Taxa named by Charles Lucien Bonaparte